"Inside of Me" is a song by American rock band Dead by Sunrise, which consists of Linkin Park lead singer Chester Bennington, as well as the band members of Julien-K. It is the fourth track from their debut album, Out of Ashes.

Background
This song consists of very aggressive elements and screams from the lead singer Chester Bennington.

In a recent article from Ultimate Guitar Archive, the single has been described as it "begins with a typical grunge type of riff with catchy verses and guitar parts that makes the track stand out. Although it was not quite as good as the previous songs, it is still considered as a very good song." In another article from Sputnik Music, the song has been described as "probably the biggest offender, appears to be nothing more than an outlet for Chester to scream to his heart’s content, but sonically it would be done justice if wrapped in the nu-metal sound he’s so well known for. There is a greater emphasis on his singing and impassioned, high range yells, which feature prominently in “Crawl Back In”, for example."

Track listing

Charts

References

2009 songs
Dead by Sunrise songs
Songs written by Chester Bennington
Song recordings produced by Howard Benson